Kaiyoppu is a 2007 Indian Malayalam-language film written by Ambikasuthan Mangad. The film was produced and directed by Ranjith and stars Mammootty, Khushbu and Mukesh.Khushbu won Kerala state Film Special Mention Award for her performance in this film.

Plot 
Balachandran, an accountant with a fertilizer company, is also someone with deep passion for books and literature. He is a bachelor, keeping himself shut from the rest of the world. Residing in a small one room at a lodge in Kochi, Balachandran had also started writing a novel, but could not go forward due to writing block. Shivadasan, a publisher, happens to read the initial parts of the novel, and is much enthusiastic about publishing this work. He persuades Balachandran to complete the work as fast as he could, so that it could be published. Shivadasan is confident about the success of this novel. Balachandran asks Shivadasan to hand over certain amount of money to one girl named Fathima, who is suffering from heart ailment. Though not have ever seen her, Balachandran is financially supporting Fatima for some time and she respects and admires him. One day Balachandran gets a call from his ex-girlfriend Padma after long years. She was his girl friend during college days, but couldn't get married due to social and financial difference between the families. She was married to a businessman in Mumbai, and is now separated from him. The arrival of Padma brings a new light into his life. They talk for long time on phone, and shares their feelings. He is then carried back to his old college life. Balachandran, in the meantime completes his novel. Shivadasan is all set to publish this work. Balachandran plans to arrive in Kozhikode, his home town for Fathima's heart surgery. Also he has plans to meet Padma after long years. He, in sudden need of finance to meet the surgery expenses, sell of his land. But that night, Feroz Babu, the owner of his lodge is arrested by police for terror charges. Though, they found no evidence at lodge, and had no proof against him, he is taken to the police station as he is a Muslim. Balachandran reaches the station to enquire about Feroz Babu, and is ill-treated by the inspector. He is poked fun for helping a Muslim girl and police blames him of being soft towards terrorists. Balachandran loses control over this and replies back emotionally. The senior officer, who arrives at the spot suddenly decides to release Feroz Babu along with Balachandran. He boards a bus to Kozhikode that night with the cash and his novel in the bag. But the next morning a bomb explodes in the bus and Balachandran is one among those who were killed.

Cast 
Mammootty as Balachandran
Khushbu as Padma
Mukesh as Shivadasan
Neena Kurup as Lalitha
Mamukkoya as Alikkoya
Anoop Menon as Dr. Jayashankar
Nedumudi Venu as C.P Vasudevan (Writer)
Kozhikode Narayanan Nair as Kammaran
Biju Pappan
Jaffar Idukki as Babu

Soundtrack 

The film's music score was composed by Vidyasagar

 "Vidhiyude Kaiyoppu"
 "Jalthe Hai Jiske Liye"
 "Venthinkal"

References

External links 
 

2000s Malayalam-language films
2007 films
Films about terrorism in India
Films directed by Ranjith
Films scored by Vidyasagar
Films set in Kerala
Films shot in Kozhikode